E264 can refer to:
 European route E264, a European route
 Ammonium acetate, a chemical compound